Haji Ghulam Dastagir Badeni is a Pakistani politician who was a Member of the Provincial Assembly of Balochistan, from May 2013 to May 2018.

Early life and education
He was born on 13 March 1975 in Nushki.

He has a degree in Bachelor of Arts.

Political career
He has served as Nazim in Nushki District.

He was elected to the Provincial Assembly of Balochistan as an independent candidate from Constituency PB-40 Noshki in 2013 Pakistani general election. He received 4,912 votes and defeated an independent candidate, Mohammad Rahim.

He joined Pakistan Muslim League (N) in June 2013.

References

Living people
Balochistan MPAs 2013–2018
1975 births
Pakistan Muslim League (N) politicians